Municipal election for Tilottama took place on 13 May 2022, across 17 wards. The electorate elected a mayor, a deputy mayor, 17 ward chairs. Ram Krishna Khand from Nepali Congress was elected as mayor of the municipality.

Background 
Tilottama was established on May 8, 2014, when the Government of Nepal announced additional 72 municipalities, including previously proposed 37 municipalities in line with the Local Self-governance Act, 1999. On July 25, 2014; demarcation of the municipality was done along with the assignment of new wards.

In the previous election, Basu Dev Ghimire from CPN (Unified Marxist–Leninist) was elected as mayor.

Candidates

Results

Mayoral election

References 

2022 Nepalese local elections
Rupandehi District
Government of Lumbini Province